Cancer Alley is the regional nickname given to an  stretch of land along the Mississippi River between Baton Rouge and New Orleans, in the River Parishes of Louisiana, which contains over 200 petrochemical plants and refineries. This area accounts for 25% of the petrochemical production in the United States. The region is considered a sacrifice zone. In Cancer Alley, forty-six individuals per one million are at risk of developing cancer, compared with the national average of roughly thirty individuals per one million. The abnormally high cancer risk and concentration of petrochemical operations inspired the "Cancer Alley" moniker.

Additionally, researchers have found that racial disparity in cancer risk from air pollution worsen as minority concentration increases across the region. Individuals in black-dominant areas are 16% more at risk than those in white-dominant areas, and people in low-income tracts also bear a cumulative risk 12% more than those in high-income tracts. Community leaders such as Sharon Lavigne have led the charge in protesting the expansion of the petrochemical industry in Cancer Alley, as well as addressing the associated racial and economic disparities.

History
In 1987, when residents of one street in St. Gabriel, Louisiana, primarily African-American and low income, noticed the abundance of cancer cases within their community, "Cancer Alley" became the new name for Jacobs Drive. As similar incidences became more and more prevalent in surrounding areas, the "alley" grew to encompass an eighty-five mile stretch along the Mississippi River.

St. James Parish consists of 48.8% African American residents. 16.6% of its population lives in poverty. However, this demographic is not reflected in the employment at the manufacturing plants.  Surveying 11 plants in the St. James Parish, researchers found that these plants only employed between 4.9% and 19.4% African Americans, which is remarkably low in comparison to the overall population.

In 2019, Louisiana had the fifth-highest death rate from cancer in the United States. While the national average is 149.09 deaths per 100,000, Louisiana's rate was 168.1 deaths per 100,000. However, according to the American Cancer Society's Statistics Center, Louisianans' risk factors for cancer rank similarly to national averages in many categories, although overweight and obesity prevalence ranked 3rd and 4th in the nation in 2017 and 2018 according to the same article. Louisiana ranked 6th highest in the nation for the number of people who get cancer, or incidence, between 2014 and 2018.

In 2018, Toxics Release Inventory (TRI) data showed that Louisiana ranked fifth throughout the nation for total releases per square mile. Louisiana, which has a population of 4.67 million, produced 8.9 billion pounds of waste in 2018, which is down from 9.4 billion in 2000 which is a 5.3% improvement despite population and industry growth over the same time period. Back in 2003,seven of the ten plants in the state with the largest combined on- and offsite releases are located in Cancer Alley, and four of the ten plants with the largest onsite releases in the state are located there.

In 1969, DuPont opened a plant to manufacture the chemical chloroprene, the main ingredient in neoprene. The plant was sold in 2015 to Japanese chemical company Denka. The area immediately adjacent to the Denka/DuPont neoprene plant in St. John the Baptist Parish has been recognized by the EPA as having a likelihood of getting cancer from air pollution over 700 times the national average.

Cancer Alley is a well-known environmental sacrifice zone in the field of environmental justice. A sacrifice zone is defined as a geographical area that has been contaminated by dangerous chemical pollution. This term originated as "National Sacrifice Zones" during the Cold War to describe areas contaminated by the mining and processing of uranium to create nuclear weapons. Today, the term has been shortened and its definition expanded to include any location facing disproportionate exposure to dangerous pollutants.

Community organizing
The injustices of Cancer Alley have resulted in many instances of community organizing, where people living in a particular area work together to fight for their shared interests. Typically, this involves historically underrepresented groups. Cancer Alley is home to some particularly successful examples of community organizing that have been taking place since the 1970s, especially in the battle to prevent new factories from being built in this 85-mile stretch of land.

In 1996, Shintech Inc. announced that they would be creating three new polyvinyl chlorides (PVC) manufacturing plants in Convent, Louisiana. The state of Louisiana issued Shintech permits to proceed with the project in 1997, despite their acknowledgment that these locations would be adding 623,000 pounds of pollutants to the air annually. The population within a five-mile radius of the site of the plants is 81% African American, compared to the overall parish population which is 49% African American.

The residents of the Convent did not take this decision lightly.  In response, a coalition called St. James Citizens for the Environment (SJCJE) drew the attention of many legal groups, including the Tulane University Environmental Law Clinic and the Sierra Club Legal Defense Fund. The combination of community organizers and larger groups was able to wage various legal battles against the company, and in 1998, Shintech decided to withdraw its project plans.

Another notable example of community organizing within Cancer Alley is a march organized in 1988 by the Gulf Coast Tenants Association and Greenpeace. These groups led protesters across the parish in an effort to raise awareness of the health and environmental concerns posed by manufacturing. One major win for the environmental justice movement came in 1992 when the 750 residents of the small town of Wallace waged a legal battle that eventually convinced the company, Formosa, to build their rayon and pulp processing plant elsewhere.

However, Formosa Plastics Corporation's intentions to further cement St. James Parish's sacrificial zone did not stop there, nor did community organizing and resistance. Formosa Plastics proposed the Sunshine Project, the $9.4 billion industrial complex to be located on the west bank of St. James Parish that is estimated to become the petrochemical and plastics project with the single greatest environmental detriment, at an estimated 13,628,086 tons of greenhouse gas emissions yearly.  The proposed complex would span 2,500 acres and will be situated one mile from an elementary school, much to the alarm of community members and environmental activists. On January 15, 2020, RISE St. James, a faith-based grassroots organization of St. James Parish community members, in conjunction with the nonprofit conservation organization Center for Biological Diversity, the grassroots organization Louisiana Bucket Brigade, and the nonprofit Healthy Gulf, sued the Trump administration for permitting Formosa Plastics' proposed petrochemical complex. The lawsuit seeks to invalidate the U.S. Army Corps of Engineers fast-tracked Clean Water Act permits that the Corps issued the year prior. It had come to light that independent archaeologists that Formosa Plastics hired had discovered that enslaved people were buried in unmarked graves beneath the 2,300-acre site that Formosa planned to develop their plastics complex on. Citing violation of federal laws in the approval of destroying wetlands, the region's first and quickly dwindling line of defense against progressively-intensifying natural disasters, as well as the failure to protect the water, air, and health of the surrounding communities, and the violation of the National Historical Preservation Act in failing to protect the burial grounds of enslaved people, the lawsuit demands the rescinding of the permits issued in September 2019 as well as the conducting of a full environmental impact study. On November 4, 2020, the U.S. Army Corps of Engineers announced its plans to suspend its permit for the Sunshine Project, a refreshing victory for the organizations and individuals seeking environmental justice.

While developments in Formosa Plastics Corporation in St. James Parish remain to be monitored, the multigenerational disenfranchisement and exploitation of Black people and people of Color are difficult to ignore. "One oppressive economy begets another," says Barbara L. Allen on the subject, a professor of science, technology, and society at Virginia Tech. She continues, "The Great River Road was built on the bodies of enslaved Black people. The chemical corridor is responsible for the body burden of their descendants." Her words are particularly poignant in relation to the economic stimulation and job creation that is promised with the proposal of each new plant in the area, while a tiny minority of full-time industry jobs are actually filled by community members who bear the brunt of the pollution burden – for example, in St. Gabriel of Iberville Parish where there now lives 30 large petrochemical plants within a 10-mile radius, only 9% of the full-time industry jobs in city are held by local residents, and at least one in four residents live in poverty. The promised economic prosperity in these major investments has never yet to be delivered, yet continues to be a cited reason for the continued approval of petrochemical permits.

Criticism 
On March 2, 2021, the United Nations (UN) Human Rights Committee discussed the continued industrial projects along the Mississippi River in Louisiana. The UN council on contemporary racism strongly condemned what they defined as environmental racism in their discussion with experts and other UN officials:This form of environmental racism poses serious and disproportionate threats to the enjoyment of several human rights of its largely African American residents, including the right to equality and non-discrimination, the right to life, the right to health, right to an adequate standard of living and cultural rights.The sentiments stated by environmental activists are echoed through this condemnation posted by the United Nation's Human Rights Commission.

On January 27, 2021, United States President Joe Biden signed an executive order regarding environmental justice and specifically cited Cancer Alley as a hard hit area. Louisiana Chemical Association President Greg Bowser responded to President Biden's remarks on the region, refuting claims that residents of the industrial corridor have a higher risk of developing cancer in multiple articles. Furthermore, he cited Louisiana Tumor Registry (LTR) data to support his claims. The LTR shows that there have not been an increase in cancer deaths connected to industrial pollution.

Activists and locals have combated the LTR. Activists claim the census tracts utilized for the LTR cover large areas and the data does not allow for specific locations next to chemical plants to be viewed individually. Moreover, the registry relies on medical records to distinguish if cancer was the cause of death. Locals are concerned that COVID-19 deaths will not attribute statistically to cancer if the victims were suffering from it. Another statistical concern for locals is that people will not seek medical help before they die because of monetary or social reasons. Louisiana health officials may not release the specific cases and data because of medical privacy laws.

Cancer studies
In their 2012 book Petrochemical America, photographer Richard Misrach and Columbia University architecture professor Kate Orff explore the social, environmental, and health impacts of the petrochemical industry in Cancer Alley through photography, writing, and infographic-style illustrations.

Cancer Alley was previously called Chemical Corridor before residents and environmental health experts claimed it was a hotbed of cancer activity. However, 50 toxic chemicals were found in the air in the area, including benzene, formaldehyde, and ethylene oxide. One of the most concerning chemicals in the area is chloroprene, which according to the Environmental Protection Agency (EPA), is likely to cause cancer. It was not until the late 1980s when the residents of the area began to notice clusters of cancer cases and miscarriages within a few miles of each other that they started to call the area Cancer Alley.

Research has shown that there are abnormally high amounts of lung, stomach, and kidney cancer among certain populations that live in Cancer Alley. There have also been cases of more rare cancers in the area like neuroblastoma, cancer of the nerve cells, and rhabdomyosarcoma, cancer of the skeletal muscle. Lung cancer is one of the most common cancers in the area because of the prevalence of industries that produce iron/steel, rubber, paint, aluminum, and other chemicals.

The University Network for Human Rights (UNHR) conducted a research study in 2018 in which they collected health data from residents within 2.5 kilometers of Cancer Alley. The survey focused on what symptoms those with lung cancer were having. One-third of the participants responded by saying that they regularly have a hard time breathing and frequently wheeze. More than 40% of participants experience frequent coughing and tend to have a sore throat. Around 30% of participants also reported feeling fatigued.

Cancer clusters
A cancer cluster can be defined as  "the occurrence of a greater than expected number of cancer cases among a group of people in a defined geographic area over a specific time period." A cancer cluster can also be suspected when multiple family members, friends, neighbors, and coworkers become diagnosed with the same type of cancer.

There has been some controversy in whether or not Cancer Alley can truly be considered a cancer cluster. Since cancer is a somewhat common disease, cases of cancer can appear to cluster even if there is no connection among them, causing cancer clusters to arise by chance. A study done on cancer clusters in the United States revealed that extensive efforts to find causes of community cancer clusters have not been successful in the past 20 years. This study did look at all 50 states and the District of Columbia and investigated cancer types, exposure, confirmation of clusters, and conclusions about a link between cancers of concern and environmental exposures.

Government action
The EPA’s National Air Toxic Assessment looked at toxic emissions around the nation in 2011 and released the findings in 2015. The study found that the air in LaPlace, Louisiana, which is an area in Cancer Alley, had a higher-than-expected level of chloroprene. This subsequently caused the EPA to begin working closely with the owner of the neoprene plant in the area, Denka Performance Elastomer, and the Louisiana Department of Environmental Quality to lower chloroprene emissions. The overall goal was to lower chloroprene emissions by 85%.

The state of Louisiana says that Denka has reached the goal of lowering emissions by 85%,  but some residents remain skeptical. Many residents believe that instead of reducing emissions by a percentage, the emissions should be 0.2 micrograms per cubic meter of air, which is what is considered a safe level by the EPA.

Mossville, Louisiana
Mossville is a small and predominantly African American community located on the outskirts of Lake Charles in Calcasieu Parish, Louisiana. It was founded in the 1790s by Jack Moss, an ex-slave, and was one of the first communities of free black people in the south. A previously thriving community was soon in proximity to multiple industrial plants that were located in the neighboring town of Westlake. The industrial plants that sit surrounding Mossville include an oil refinery, several petrochemical plants, and one of the country’s largest concentrations of manufacturers of vinyl chloride which is the main ingredient in polyvinyl chloride, or the plastic known as PVC. All of these facilities emit millions of pounds of toxins into the air, water, and soil each year.

A lifelong resident Llen LeBlanc told his story about living in Mossville back in 2015. LeBlanc is on disability and has had seizures, liver problems, a stroke, tremors, insomnia, fatigue, and depression plague his life. He also attributes his health problems not to unhealthy habits or that they are hereditary but to the toxic emissions from the industrial plants that are located in Westlake. LeBlanc said that he has known for more than 15 years that his body courses with toxins and would trade anything for a new life.

The Mossville Environmental Action Now (MEAN) was organized in 1998 by a group of local residents. MEAN had the help of Greenpeace to convince a federal agency within the Centers for Disease Control and Prevention to conduct toxicological testing. The Agency for Toxic Substance and Disease Registry (ATSDR) drew blood from 28 Mossville residents, including LeBlanc. The screenings were essentially looking for dioxins and dioxin-like compounds, also known as some of the most hazardous chemicals in science. The toxicology results showed that the average dioxin level among the Mossville community was triple that of the general United States population. The dioxin rates were also among the highest ever recorded in the country.

Environmental racism
Many scholars and residents of Cancer Alley have referred to the area as a "frontline example of environmental racism." Environmental racism can be defined as the institutional rules, regulations, policies, or government/corporate decisions that deliberately target certain communities for locally undesirable land uses and lax enforcement of zoning and environmental laws, resulting in communities being disproportionately exposed to toxic and hazardous waste based on race. Environmental racism can also be caused by several factors. These factors include intentional neglect, the alleged need for a receptacle for pollutants in urban areas, and a lack of institutional power and low land values of people of color. It is also a well-documented and well-known fact that communities of color and low-income communities are disproportionately impacted by polluting industries and lax regulation of these industries.

Environmental impacts
The location of Cancer Alley also poses more environmental impacts other than air pollution. Since Cancer Alley is located closer to the Gulf of Mexico, hurricanes pose a great risk and have caused large amounts of damage in past years. For example, in 2005, Hurricane Katrina caused almost 11 million gallons of oil to spill into the water near New Orleans. Hurricane Harvey in 2017 caused power outages which led to unrefrigerated chemicals in a plant in Houston decomposing and igniting into a large fireball. In 2020, Hurricane Laura caused a fire at a plant that produced pool chemicals which led to chlorine gas being burned for three days.

One of the largest environmental impacts happened when Hurricane Ida hit in 2021. The storm’s projected path was through the industrial region. The threat of the hurricane’s destruction caused the industries located in Cancer Alley to release unprocessed chemicals and gases into the air via "flaring." Even though flaring causes chemicals to be released into the air, the process is legal in emergencies and burns the chemicals directly into the air. After the hurricane, residents were not only left with damaged homes but also more pollution in the air and water than usual.

Activism and environmental justice
In recent years in the United States, the environmental protection and civil rights movements have merged to form an environmental justice movement in response to minority and low-income communities throughout the country being constantly threatened by pollution. Many communities that face the largest burdens from pollution tend to be poor and consist mainly of minorities. Due to this, poor and minority communities will resort to grassroots activism to protect themselves.

In September 2022, environmental justice advocates in southern Louisiana were able to declare victory after two decisions denied two major petrochemical complexes from moving forward. The state district court Judge Trudy White released a decision that reversed and vacated 14 air regulations permits that the Louisiana Department of Environmental Quality (LDEQ) had issued for the proposed Formosa Plastics Group complex in the town of Welcome. The town already has multiple oil refineries and industrial plants and is located in Cancer Alley.

Another group that has been actively fighting against the petrochemical industry in Cancer Alley is Rise St. James. Rise St. James is a faith-based grassroots organization that fights for environmental justice and works to defeat the proliferation of petrochemical industries in St. James Parish, Louisiana. The organization successfully defeated the construction of a $1.25 billion plastics manufacturing plant in 2019 and is currently fighting to prevent Formosa Plastics from building a multibillion-dollar plant in the parish. Rise St. James is also committed to educating the community and those outside of the community about the chemicals they breathe in every day. The organization's website includes a "Chemical of the Month" page and provides information on a specific chemical and how much it is found in certain areas of Cancer Alley.

In popular culture
British industrial metal band Godflesh used a digitally altered image of a crucifix in front of Cancer Alley as the cover art for their 1996 album, Songs of Love and Hate.

Sociologist Arlie Russell Hochschild discusses the environmental and health conditions in Cancer Alley, as well as the socioeconomic and political ramifications, in her 2016 book Strangers in Their Own Land.

See also
 Cancer cluster
 Environmental justice
 Environmental racism
 Environmental racism in the United States
 Love Canal
 McCastle v. Rollins Environmental Services
 Valley of the Drums

References

Further reading
 
 The documentary film "Fuel" by Josh Tickell. [www.thefuelfilm.com]

External links
 Cancer Alley, Louisiana from Pollutionissues.com
 Cancer Alley: Myth or Fact?, Unwelcome Neighbors: How the poor bear the burdens of America's pollution. New Orleans Times-Picayune.
 Cancer Alley. BBC.
 Cancer Alley: Big Industry, Big Problems at MSNBC

Environmental issues in the United States
Environment of Louisiana
Environment of Mississippi